Amphiporthe is a genus of fungi within the family Valsaceae.

References

External links
Amphiporthe at Index Fungorum

Diaporthales
Taxa named by Franz Petrak